Turi Pandolfini (1 November 1883 – 6 March 1962) was an Italian stage and film character actor. He appeared in 46 films between 1917 and 1961.

Life and career
Born  in Catania, Sicily as Salvatore Pandolfini, the nephew of the actor Angelo Musco, he started his career at young age in small local companies before joining the company of his famous uncle in which he created a large number of successful macchiette ( (i.e. comical monologues caricaturing stock characters).

Pandolfini was also very active in films starting from the advent of sound, and reached the peak of his popularity in the fifties. He was one of the founders of the Teatro Stabile di Catania.

Partial filmography

 La stella del cinema (1931)
 La vecchia signora (1932)
 La voce lontana (1933)
 1860 (1933) - Another Sicilian citizen
 L'albergo della felicità (1933) - Ignazio Privitero
 The Marquis of Ruvolito (1939) - Neddu Grisi
 Sempre più difficile (1943) - Don Ignazio D'Azevegno
 Rome, Open City (1945) - Grandfather (uncredited)
 In the Name of the Law (1949) - Don Fifì
 The Fighting Men (1950)
 The City Stands Trial (1952) - Ragionier Filippetti
 In Olden Days (1952) - Primo cancelliere (segment "Il processo di Frine")
 Good Folk's Sunday (1953) - Il parroco
 Noi peccatori (1953) - Il collega vecchio
 Siamo tutti inquilini (1953) - Cavalier Terzetti
 Legione straniera (1953) - Gennaro
 Empty Eyes (1953) - Macaluso
 Easy Years (1953) - Veterano I guerra mondiale
 Verdi, the King of Melody (1953) - Impiegato del banco dei Pegni (uncredited)
 Condannatelo! (1953) - Simone
 A Day in Court (1954) - Il cancelliere
 Of Life and Love (1954) - Zi' Dima (segment "La giara")
 100 Years of Love (1954) - The Veterinary Surgeon (segment "Garibaldina")
 A Slice of Life (1954) - (segment "Don Corradino")
 High School (1954) - Scandurra - Professore di Storia
 Schiava del peccato (1954) - Registrar Di Marco
 The Three Thieves (1954) - Leonardo da Vinci - the inventor
 It Happened at the Police Station (1954) - Cannizzaro, the old man
 Le signorine dello 04 (1955) - Cavaliere
 Scuola elementare (1955) - Salvatore Serafini
 The Art of Getting Along (1955) - Prisoner (uncredited)
 Buonanotte... avvocato! (1955) - Bianca Maria's Grandpa
 Bella non piangere (1955) - Il ragonier Parisi
 New Moon (1955) - Domenico
 Accadde al penitenziario (1955) - Un detenuto
 La moglie è uguale per tutti (1955) - Beretta
 Bravissimo (1955) - Arturo Pandolfino
 Roman Tales (1955) - The Bespectacled Customer at Barber's (uncredited)
 Allow Me, Daddy! (1956) - Il nonno Giovanni
 I calunniatori (1956) - Nonno di Dorina
 I pinguini ci guardano (1956)
 Arrivano i dollari! (1957) - The Butler
 Lazzarella (1957) - Professor Avallone
 Legs of Gold (1958) - Sindaco
 Three Strangers in Rome (1958) - Turiddu, forester
 Arriva la banda (1959)
 Howlers in the Dock (1960) - Il senatore Bucci
 Io bacio... tu baci (1961)

References

External links

1883 births
1962 deaths
Italian male film actors
Italian male stage actors
Actors from Catania
20th-century Italian male actors